The International Soling Association, ISA, was founded as soon as the Soling became an International class in 1967. Originally an "Owners Club" became a very self-supporting organization who provided great support for the whole Soling community and guarded the Soling one-design during her Olympic tour of duty as well as in the present time.

Object 
The object of the ISA is to promote the Soling Class throughout the world, to co‐ordinate competition under uniform rules, and to maintain the integrity of the one‐design nature of the class in co‐operation with World Sailing (WS) and the National Soling Associations (NSAs).

Governance 
The operation of the ISA is in the hands of the ISA Committee and is lay down within a set of rules.

ISA Committee 
1 January 2022 - 31 December 2022

(Past) Presidents & Secretaries

Rules 
The ISA rule set consist of the following documents:
 WS INTERNATIONAL SOLING CLASS RULES
 ISA Constitution
 ISA Championship rules
 ISA Ranking Ruling
 ISA Standard Notice Of Race
 ISA Standard Sailing Instructions
 ISA Permitted Instruments
 ISA Championship Agreement Form

National Soling Associations 
In 2019 there are 24 NSAs active and there are three countries with individual fleets. Since 1968 over fifty countries (not counting the no longer existing countries like the USSR, Yugoslavia and East-Germany).

International Trophies

International Championships 
Under auspices if the ISA the following annual International regattas are organized. These events are Open for sailors of all nationalities. For these regattas the ISA Championship rules applies. The Notice of Race and Sailing Instructions must written be as close as possible to the ISA Standard Notice of Race and the ISA Standard Sailing Instruction end must be approved by the ISA Championship Committee:
 Soling World Championship
 Continental Championships
 Soling European Championship
 Soling North American Championship
 Soling South American Championship
 Soling World Trophy

Besides these regattas the ISA is also part of the Vintage Yachting Games Organization.

The National Soling Associations will organize there Soling National Champions and local regattas.

Publications of the ISA 1970–present

References

Sports organizations established in 1967
Soling